Sushil Chandra Varma (24 February 1926 – 6 October 2011) was an Indian politician.

Sushil Chandra Varma was born on 24 February 1926 in Khandwa, Madhya Pradesh and married Renu Varma in 1951. He attended the University of Bhopal and the University of Allahabad, earning an M.Sc. in chemistry and a Ph.D in sociology. He joined the Indian Administrative Service in 1949 and held various posts in Madhya Pradesh and in Delhi.

Varma was elected from the Bhopal constituency to the 9th, 10th, 11th and 12th Lok Sabhas, with the first of those elections occurring in 1991. He was a member of various parliamentary committees and of the Bharatiya Janata Party.

He committed suicide in 2011, having suffered from ill-health for some years previously.

References

2011 deaths
Politicians from Bhopal
Suicides in India
Indian civil servants
1926 births
India MPs 1989–1991
India MPs 1991–1996
India MPs 1996–1997
India MPs 1998–1999
University of Allahabad alumni
Lok Sabha members from Madhya Pradesh
People from Khandwa
Bharatiya Janata Party politicians from Madhya Pradesh